Eosphargis is an extinct genus of sea turtles from the Eocene of Africa, Europe, and North America. It was first named by Richard Lydekker in 1889, and contains one species, E. gigas. The species is also known as Anglocetus beatsoni.

External links
 Eosphargis at the Paleobiology Database
 animaldiversity.umnz.umich.edu

Eocene turtles
Eocene reptiles of North America
Paleogene reptiles of Africa
Eocene reptiles of Europe
Dermochelyidae
Prehistoric turtle genera
Taxa named by Richard Lydekker
Fossil taxa described in 1889
Monotypic prehistoric reptile genera
Fossils of Denmark
Fur Formation